Mulberry is a hamlet in the parish of Lanivet, Cornwall, England.

References

Hamlets in Cornwall